Casalegno is a family name of Italian origin. Notable people with the surname include:

 Elenoire Casalegno (born 1976), Italian television presenter
 Gabriele Casalegno (born  1923), Italian rugby player
 Mattia Casalegno, Italian artist

Italian-language surnames